Arrhenia acerosa, commonly known as the moss oysterling, is a species of agaric fungus in the family Hygrophoraceae. It is found in Europe, where it grows on mosses.

References

External links

Fungi described in 1821
Fungi of Europe
Hygrophoraceae
Taxa named by Elias Magnus Fries